Newday is an annual Christian youth festival for Churches from all denominations, initially organised by the Newfrontiers family of churches. Established since August 2004, the event is aimed at young people between the ages of 12 to 18.

Vision

Newday's stated vision is to play a role in stopping the drift away from God in young people's lives. This includes performing voluntary community work during the festival period, worshipping God through music, preachers and prayers.

History
The first Newday event in 2004 was held at Newark showground, Lincolnshire and was attended by about 3500. It was interrupted by torrential rainfall flooding the camp site causing many young people to be evacuated into nearby schools and leisure centres.

The 2005 event moved to Notts County Stadium, Nottingham, with an attendance of about 5000. The 2006 event was at Uttoxeter Racecourse, Staffordshire, attended by nearly 6000. In 2009, it moved to Norfolk Showground, Norwich, with approximately 7000 people in attendance.

In 2020 and 2021 the event moved online due to the ongoing Covid-19 pandemic.

Discography

During each festival, a live album is recorded and released.

See also
 Mobilise, a similar Newfrontiers conference aimed at students and twenties

References

External links
 Newday official site
 Newday official videos
 Newday worship site

Newfrontiers
Evangelical Christian music festivals
British New Church Movement
Christian festivals